Jacob Dawson (born 3 November 1999) is a former professional Australian rules footballer who played for the Gold Coast Football Club in the Australian Football League (AFL).

Early life
Dawson was raised on the Gold Coast and grew up playing his junior football for the Burleigh Bombers. His father, Paul, played professional basketball in the National Basketball League. Jacob attended Palm Beach Currumbin High School throughout his youth and was placed in the Gold Coast Suns' academy at 13 years of age. He switched to the Palm Beach Currumbin Football Club at 17 years old and was chosen to represent the Gold Coast in the Academy Series and the Allies in the 2017 AFL Under 18 Championships. Dawson also played in Palm Beach Currumbin's 2017 QAFL senior premiership winning team.

In November 2017, he was picked with a rookie selection by the Gold Coast Football Club at the AFL draft.

AFL career
Dawson made his AFL debut in round 14 of the 2018 AFL season against Hawthorn. Dawson was delisted at the end of the 2019 season.

References

External links

 

1999 births
Living people
Sportspeople from the Gold Coast, Queensland
Gold Coast Football Club players
Australian rules footballers from Queensland